MTC may refer to:

Organizations

Education
 Mandarin Training Center, in Taiwan
 Manila Tytana Colleges, in Pasay, Philippines
 Marion Technical College, in Marion, Ohio
Mastery Transcript Consortium
 Missionary Training Center
 Mississippi Teacher Corps

Entertainment
 Manhattan Theatre Club
 Manitoba Theatre Centre
 Melbourne Theatre Company, in Australia

Telecommunications
 Mobile Telecommunications Company
 Mobile Telecommunications Limited, Namibia
 Mongolia Telecom Company

Transport
 Mechanised Transport Corps, a British women's civilian organization that provided drivers for government departments
 Meerut City railway station, by station code
 Metropolitan Transport Corporation (Chennai), operates the public bus service in Chennai, India
 Metropolitan Transportation Commission (San Francisco Bay Area)
 Ministry of Transport and Communications (Venezuela)
 Mitcham Eastfields railway station, London, by National Rail station code
 Montreal Transit Corporation
 Metro Transit (Minnesota), Minneapolis–Saint Paul, formerly Metropolitan Transit Commission
 Mackay Transit Coaches, operates Public Transport in the city of Mackay, Queensland

Other organizations
 Major trauma centre, a type of specialist unit in the United Kingdom
 Management and Training Corporation, manages private prisons and U.S. Job Corps centers
 Morgan Technical Ceramics
 Multistate Tax Commission, a U.S. intergovernmental state tax agency
 MTČ, a Croatian knitwear company

Other uses
 Coordinated Mars Time, a proposed Mars analog to Universal Time
 MIDI timecode
 Mill test report (metals industry)
 Medullary thyroid cancer
 Metropolitan Transition Center, a prison in Baltimore, Maryland
 McLaren Technology Centre, headquarters of McLaren
 "MTC", a song by S3RL, 2012

See also
 Metropolitan Transit Commission (disambiguation)